Eastville Stadium, also known as Bristol Stadium and Bristol Stadium – Eastville, was a stadium in Eastville, a northern suburb of the English city of Bristol.

Constructed in 1897, it was the home of Bristol Rovers F.C., the Bristol Bulldogs speedway team and was also a greyhound racing venue. During 1986 it was also the home of the short-lived Bristol Bombers American football team.

Football

History
Rovers played their home games at Eastville (nicknamed "The Ville") until forced to leave by financial difficulties in 1986. Rovers then spent a decade at Twerton Park in Bath before returning to the city to play at the Memorial Stadium where they remain to this day. The record attendance was 39,462.

Bristol Rovers have never played in the top flight of English football. The highest level of football which Eastville Stadium hosted was in the Football League Second Division.

Built near to a gas holder, the constant smell of town gas in the air gave rise to the name used for Bristol Rovers fans of "The Gas" or "Gasheads". The nickname "The Gas" began as a derogatory nickname used by Bristol City fans, however Rovers fans now refer to themselves as Gasheads as a badge of honour. The number 12 squad shirt has been officially allocated to "Gasheads" by the club in honour of the crowd being the 12th man.

Another unique feature of Eastville was the flower beds behind each goal.

Tote End

The Tote End or simply the Tote was a large section of covered terracing behind one of the goals. Originally built in 1935, the Tote End terrace was built following the curve of the greyhound racing track. It had a small covered section in the South-West corner.

The Totaliser clocks mounted first on the back of the terrace and then after a larger roof was added in 1961 to cover most of the terrace, on the roof fascia, gave it its name.

With a boisterous and intimidating atmosphere, largely due to it being a favoured spot for the more vociferous Rovers supporters, and given the nature of football in Britain in the 1970s, it became notoriously linked with bovver boys and hooliganism – a period documented by the book Bovver by Chris Brown.

Shortly after Rovers left Eastville in 1986, the Tote End was bulldozed.

Speedway
In 1977 the Newport Wasps speedway team relocated to Bristol as the Bristol Bulldogs and remarkably the speedway track was placed on top of the greyhound circuit and then dug up again every meeting. The speedway only ran for two seasons in the British League before the team withdrew, and speedway has never been run in the city since.

Greyhound racing

Opening
Racing started on Saturday 16 June 1928 becoming the second track in Bristol to open after Knowle Stadium. The first ever winner was a greyhound called Vivacious who collected £20 for his connections.

History

The totalisator system was introduced in 1932 securing the future of the stadium, this was in contrast to the football club who were in financial difficulties. During 1939 Bristol Rovers F.C negotiated a sale price to the Bristol Greyhound Company, albeit by the chairman, who carried out the deal without the knowledge of his fellow directors. Eastville changed hands for £12,000 and the first General Manager was Lieutenant-Colonel Forsdike who was to become secretary of the National Greyhound Racing Club.

The Golden Crest competition was introduced in 1937 and became one of the most important races in the provincial calendar. In 1945 Shannon Shore recorded an impressive win by ten lengths in a new track record for 500 yards; the black dog was timed at 28.76secs during the Golden Crest final. A second major competition was introduced in 1946 and this was the Western Two Year Old Produce Stakes.

In 1947 Oxford Stadium owner Leslie Calcutt was appointed as Director of Bristol Greyhound Racing Association Ltd, a move that would eventually result in Bristol taking over Oxford. The company also acquired Swindon Stadium in 1952 and would be known as Bristol Stadium Ltd following the death of Leslie Calcutt.

Eastville became one of the first circuits to abandon grass in 1968, becoming sand based, many tracks would follow suit over the next decade. After selling Oxford Stadium to the council Ian Stevens became General Manager at Eastville in 1975 and in 1980 the track became one of eight tracks to be awarded Bookmakers Afternoon Greyhound Service (BAGS) contracts resulting in a steady income stream. The track suffered a serious fire in August 1980 with the majority of the south stand destroyed causing more than £1 million worth of damage. As a result of the fire the track closed for two months for repairs to be made.

When trainer Henry Kibble retired his son Terry took over the kennels and provided Eastville with its first English Greyhound Derby finalist in 1991 with Dempsey Duke. The greyhound also won the Blue Riband, East Anglian Derby and Reading Masters.

Closure
The company now known as the BS Group sold Eastville for development, plans were announced for a new Bristol greyhound stadium but never came to fruition. The stadium closed on 27 October 1997 with the entire greyhound operation moving to sister track Swindon. The site became an IKEA superstore.

Competitions
Western Two Year Old Produce Stakes
Golden Crest

Track records
Pre-metric

Post-metric

Important dates

1897 – Bristol Rovers first appearance at Eastville 
1921 – Bristol Rovers purchase the stadium. 
1924 – The mostly wooden south stand was built. 
1935 – The Tote End was constructed. 
1940 – The stadium is sold to the Bristol Greyhound Company. 
1952 – First Commentary Broadcast to the Bristol Hospitals by the Bristol Hospital Broadcasting Service. 23 August v Shrewsbury Town: Rovers won 2–1.
1959 – The North Stand opened, and floodlights installed.
1960 – Highest recorded attendance for a Rovers match. 38,472 v Preston North End in the FA Cup 4th Round, 30 January. 
1961 – A roof and new terracing installed at the Tote End. 
1969 – M32 motorway opened. 
1977 – Motorcycle speedway introduced to the ground. 
1980 – South Stand fire in August. 
1986 – Bristol Rovers play their last game at Eastville.
1997 – Last Greyhound meeting 
1998 – Eastville stadium demolished.

Notes

External links

Photo showing the Tote End with the totaliser clocks
Photo showing supporters at the Tote End

Bristol Rovers F.C.
Defunct greyhound racing venues in the United Kingdom
Defunct speedway venues in England
Defunct football venues in England
Football venues in Bristol
Defunct sports venues in Bristol
Sports venues completed in 1897
Sports venues demolished in 1998
English Football League venues
Demolished sports venues in the United Kingdom